Gerardo Ortega de Francisco (born 13 October 1947) is a Spanish footballer who played as a striker.

He scored three goals from 18 La Liga games for Real Murcia over the course of two seasons.

Club career 
Born in Morón de Almazán in the province of Soria, Castile and León, Ortega played with Rayo Vallecano, Real Madrid, Calvo Sotelo, Logroñés, Real Murcia, Villena, Almansa and Albacete. With the second club he played only one match in 1968–69 season against the Cypriot club AEL in the second leg of the preliminary round of the 1968–69 European Cup, scoring the fifth goal in his team's 6–0 victory, as they won by the same score in the first leg.

Most of Ortega's appearances during his career were in the lower divisions, Ortega made his La Liga debut on 17 February 1974 with Real Murcia as he came on as a substitute for Vera Palmés in the 70th minute of a 1–2 loss away to Sporting Gijón.

International
He competed in the men's tournament at the 1968 Summer Olympics. He earned five caps and scored one goal.

International goals

References

External links
 

1947 births
Living people
Spanish footballers
Olympic footballers of Spain
Footballers at the 1968 Summer Olympics
Sportspeople from the Province of Soria
Association football forwards
Footballers from Castile and León
Real Madrid CF players
Rayo Vallecano players
Real Murcia players
La Liga players
Segunda División players
CD Logroñés footballers
CD Puertollano footballers
Albacete Balompié players
Tercera División players